Gulf Coast High School is a public high school located in North Naples, Florida about  from Naples, Florida. The school opened in August 1998 and is part of the District School Board of Collier County.

Athletics
Gulf Coast High School is one of the seven members of the Collier County Athletic Conference and also belongs to the Florida High School Athletic Association (FHSAA).  The school offers the following athletic programs.

Fall sports
Boys & Girls Cross Country
American football (Freshmen, JV, Varsity)
Boys & Girls Golf
Boys & Girls Swimming & Diving
Girls Volleyball (Freshmen, JV, Varsity)
Girls Cheerleading

Winter sports
Boys & Girls Soccer (JV, Varsity)
Wrestling
Boys & Girls Basketball (Freshmen, JV, Varsity)

Spring sports
Baseball
Softball
Boys & Girls Tennis
Boys & Girls Track and field
Boys & Girls Lacrosse (JV, Varsity)
The boys soccer team have won the state championship 3 times: in 2013, 2018, and 2021.

Career academies
Gulf Coast High School is home to three different Career Academies.  The goal of these programs is to help students that are interested in a certain career.

Sports and Entertainment Academy
This academy focuses on the promotion of sports, sports teams, and sports events.

Medical Academy
The Medical Academy's goal is to prepare students to pursue a career in any medical field they may be interested in.

Engineering Academy
For prospective students looking into the engineering field.

Courses offered at Gulf Coast include Introduction to Engineering Design (IED), Digital Engineering (DE), Principles of Engineering (POE), Aerospace Engineering (AE), Engineering Design and Development (EDD).

Extracurricular activities
Gulf Coast High School is home to many different extracurricular clubs.  An accurate, up-to-date list is difficult to keep, as clubs are added and dropped as students graduate or lose interest.  However, some of the notable clubs are:

Key Club
National Honor Society
Student Government
Drama Club
Glee Club
DECA
Fellowship of Christian Athletes
FBLA
Spanish & French Honor Societies
Model United Nations
Gay/Straight Alliance
Band
Orchestra
Color guard
Scholar Bowl

Theatre
Gulf Coast High School is part of District Six thespians and is International Thespian Society Troupe number 5876. Each year the theatre troupe puts on four main events.  First there is a main-stage, full length production.  There is also either a musical or dinner theatre, and then there are two shows featuring events scheduled to appear in District competition including Evening Extraordinaire: A One Act affair, and A Dramatic Showcase (featuring Individual Events).  Occasionally there are  shows that are produced every few years.

Pieces are rated in the following fashion: Superior, Excellent, Good, Fair, Poor.  In 2006, for the first time in troupe history, one theatre student received the award for Best Overall Technical Theatre Piece for their Costume design in the District 6 Competition.  This piece was chosen by the judges as the best technical theatre entry out of all the high schools participating, and out of all sub-categories in Technical Theatre.  In 2007, three students were chosen to represent District 6 in State Competition.  One received the award for Best Overall Technical Theatre Piece for a scenic design in the District 6 Competition, and a duo received the award for the Best Overall Pantomime in the District 6 Competition. In 2010, Gulf Coast High School received further acclaim after receiving straight superiors on their one-act play, and on three individual student's monologues. The students also participated at the Florida State Thespian Competition in Tampa, Florida back in April 2010.

Inventeam
In 2004, Gulf Coast High School was one of thirteen schools nationwide that received a $10,000 grant from the Lemelson-MIT Inventeams Program.  The program is part of the Lemelson-MIT program which endeavors to foster a spirit of research and invention in high schools nationwide through grants.  The GCHS Inventeam's invention was a hybrid between an air ionizing system similar to the Ionic Breeze and a typical ceiling fan.  The idea was that the ceiling fan would circulate the air around the room, and as the air flowed over the ionizing system it would be cleaned as well, providing multipurpose from an appliance standard in many households.

Model United Nations
The GCHS Model United Nations team is one of the premier activities in Gulf Coast High School. Recently expanding its program in 2010, the team has since won delegation awards at Georgia Tech, Columbia, UCLA, Pennsylvania, Stanford, Miami, FGCU, among many more delegate awards at other conferences. In Fall 2011, the team was ranked 10th in the nation, hardly a year after the expansion of its program. In 2018, the team was ranked number one in the nation for public schools, and 6th overall.

Band 
The GCHS band is the largest band in Florida, with about 350 members. Every year, the band participates in either the Universal or Disney parades. In 2015, the band participated in the nationally televised Macy's Thanksgiving Day Parade in New York City.

Demographics 
These are the school's demographics as of May 2021:

 White: 63%
 Hispanic: 25%
 Black: 5%
 Asian: 3%
 Multi-racial: 2%
 Native American: 0.5%

Campus
Most of the building is on a single level, however Building 5, being the largest building, has classrooms on a second floor and the 1,200-seat auditorium has a balcony on a second level. The school includes computer labs, a gymnasium, a 3,000-seat capacity football stadium, cafeteria, media center, TV Production Studio, and darkrooms for photography.

Building 1: Administrative Offices
Building 2: Gymnasium
Building 3: P.E. Dept.
Building 4: Classrooms
Building 5: Classrooms
Building 6: Classrooms
Building 7: Cafeteria
Building 8: Auditorium; Music Classrooms

Accolades
In 2015, the school was included in U.S. News & World Report's Best High Schools Ranking, and was one of six Collier County schools to earn a medal. The school was given a silver medal.

Notable alumni
Jake O'Connell, former professional NFL player
Marcel Rodriguez, Filmmaker/Actor

Related links
Collier County Public Schools
Official School Web Site

References

High schools in Collier County, Florida
Public high schools in Florida